Torre Cabrera may refer to a pair of coastal towers in Sicily, Italy:

Torre Cabrera (Marina di Ragusa)
Torre Cabrera (Pozzallo)

See also
Cabrera (disambiguation)